

Ghana at the 1994 Commonwealth Games was abbreviated GHA.

Medals

Gold
none

Silver
none

Bronze
Tijani Moro — Boxing, Men's Light Welterweight.

Ghana at the Commonwealth Games
1994 in Ghanaian sport
Nations at the 1994 Commonwealth Games